The district of Champlain was established in 1829, under the regime of the Constitutional Act of 1791.  It was located in the current Mauricie area and was located northeast of the district of Saint-Maurice on the north shore of the St. Lawrence River.

Champlain was represented simultaneously by two Members at the Legislative Assembly of Lower Canada.

Members for Champlain (1830-1838)

{| border="1" cellpadding="5" cellspacing="0" style="border-collapse: collapse border-color: #444444"
|- bgcolor="darkgray"
| 
|Name
|Party
|Election 

|Olivier TrudelParti Canadien1830

|Olivier TrudelParti Patriote1834

|NamePartyElection

|Pierre-Antoine DorionParti Canadien1830

|Pierre-Antoine DorionParti Patriote1834
|}

Footnotes

See also
Champlain, Quebec
Champlain (electoral district in Canada East)
Champlain (Quebec provincial electoral district)
History of Canada
History of Quebec
Politics of Canada
Politics of Quebec
Sainte-Anne-de-la-Pérade
Saint-Maurice—Champlain Federal Electoral District

Electoral districts of Lower Canada
1830 establishments in Lower Canada
1838 disestablishments in Lower Canada
Constituencies established in 1829
Constituencies disestablished in 1838